Visa requirements for EFTA nationals are administrative entry restrictions by the authorities of other states placed on citizens of the European Free Trade Association (EFTA) member states.

Current member states of EFTA are Iceland, Liechtenstein, Norway and Switzerland.

Member states' citizens enjoy freedom of movement in each other's territories in accordance with the EFTA convention. EFTA nationals also enjoy freedom of movement in the European Union (EU). EFTA nationals and EU citizens and are not only visa-exempt but are legally entitled to enter and reside in each other's countries. The Citizens’ Rights Directive (also sometimes called the "Free Movement Directive") defines the right of free movement for citizens of the European Economic Area (EEA), which includes the three EFTA members Iceland, Norway and Liechtenstein and the member states of the EU. Switzerland, which is a member of EFTA but not of the EEA, is not bound by the Directive but rather has a separate bilateral agreement on free movement with the EU.

Visa requirements maps

Visa free access
This table lists all countries, as of this date with source information as it is cited inline, for which citizens of at least one EFTA member state may enter without a visa on an ordinary passport. Information regarding visas on arrival and on exit fees is not listed in the table, regarding which, see the relevant section below.

All EFTA nationals can visit the following partially recognised countries or territories with autonomous immigration policies without a visa: 

Asia 

 
 

Europe

Reciprocity

The EFTA member states are all part of the Schengen Area, an area comprising 26 European states that have eliminated border controls with other Schengen members and strengthened border controls with non-Schengen countries. The Schengen area mostly functions as a single country for international travel purposes, with a common visa policy. Since 2001, the European Union has issued two lists regarding visas for the Schengen Area: a white list of countries whose nationals do not require visas (Annex II) and a black list of countries whose nationals do require visas (Annex I). As per Regulation No 539/2001 (amended by Regulation No 1289/2013) reciprocity is required from all Annex II countries and territories. That means that these countries must offer visa-free access for 90 days to citizens of the 26 Schengen member states.

When this is not the case, the affected Schengen member state is expected to notify the European Commission. Starting six months after the notification, the Commission may adopt an implementing act to suspend the visa-free regime for certain categories of nationals of the third country concerned, for a period of up to six months, with a possible prolongation by further periods of up to six months. If the Commission decides not to adopt such an act, it has to present a report explaining the reasons why it did not propose the measure. If after two years from the notification the third country is still requiring visas from citizens of one or more Member States, the Commission shall adopt a delegated act to re-impose the visa obligation on all citizens of the third country, for a period of 12 months. Either the European Parliament or the Council could oppose the entry into force of the delegated acts. All of the states that implement the common visa rules – including Iceland, Liechtenstein, Norway, Switzerland, Bulgaria, Croatia, Cyprus and Romania – may notify the European Commission about non-compliant third states.

According to a report from April 2015, the Commission dismissed notifications by both Bulgaria and Romania of a general visa requirement by Australia. It concluded that the Australian electronic visa 'manual processing' treatment should not be considered as equivalent to the Schengen visa application procedures and consequently will not be covered by the reciprocity mechanism. In its previous report, the Commission also committed to assessing certain provisions of the US electronic visa system — such as the application fee.
In its previous report, the Commission also committed to assessing certain provisions of the US ESTA system — such as the application fee — and the Australian eVisitor system.

Special requirements
The following countries require electronic registrations for all EFTA nationals:
 Australia requires EFTA nationals to obtain an eVisitor, which is issued free of charge.
 Canada requires EFTA nationals to obtain an eTA. The application fee is 7 CAD.
New Zealand requires EFTA nationals to obtain an NZeTA and IVL if arriving by air. The application fee is NZD 9 or 12 and NZD 35.
United States requires EFTA nationals to obtain an ESTA. The application fee is US$21.

Visa on arrival
The following countries provide visa on arrival to EFTA nationals. Some countries may not provide visa on arrival facilities at all entry points.

Limited visa on arrival
 - Visas are issued on arrival if an Entry Authorisation letter was issued by the authorities of Burundi.
 – Holders of ordinary passports of all EFTA member states except Switzerland may obtain a visa on arrival for Iraqi Kurdistan valid for 15 days when arriving through the Erbil International Airport or Sulaimaniyah International Airport.
 - Nationals from Norway and Switzerland may obtain visa on arrival when travelling on business. They must have a local sponsor who must obtain an approval from the immigration authorities at the port of arrival (Islamabad, Lahore, Peshawar, Quetta or Karachi airports) and a recommendation letter from country of residence or invitation letter from Pakistan. Nationals of Iceland and Norway may obtain a visa on arrival for a maximum stay of 30 days, if they are travelling as part of a group through a designated tour operator.
 - Visas are issued on arrival for 30 days (extendable once) provided an invitation letter issued by the sponsor has been submitted to the Airport Immigration Department at least 2 days before arrival.
 - Visitors can obtain a visa on arrival for a maximum stay of 1 or 3 months if they are holders of an approval letter issued and stamped by the Vietnamese Immigration Department (obtainable online through travel agencies for a fee) and if arriving only at airports in Hanoi, Ho Chi Minh City or Da Nang. All travellers can visit Phú Quốc without a visa for up to 30 days.

Online visas
The following countries provide electronic visas to EFTA nationals.

Prearranged visa required 
All EFTA citizens must always arrange the visa prior to travel to (as of March 2017) the following countries.

Other
 – Citizens of Iceland and Switzerland transiting through People's Republic of China at one of the following airports and other ports of entry may visit the city for up to: 72 hours – Changsha, Chengdu, Chongqing, Dalian, Guangzhou, Guilin, Harbin, Kunming, Qingdao, Shenyang, Tianjin, Wuhan, Xi'an and Xiamen, 144 hours – Beijing's Capital International airport and West Railway station, Hangzhou, Nanjing, Shanghai's Hongqiao and Pudong international airports, railway station and port, Shijiazhuang Zhengding International Airport, Tianjin's Binhai International Airport and International Cruise Homeport and Qinhuangdao Port. Visa-free access to Hainan Island as long as the visit lasts 15 days or less and is part of a tour group organised by a National Tourism Administration of China-approved travel agency based in Hainan is granted to the following EFTA nationals - Norway and Switzerland.
 – Simplified visa procedure for citizens of Iceland and Norway. Unlike other visitors, they do not have to submit a criminal record certificate and a certificate of medical fitness together with visa application. 
 - all EFTA nationals are eligible for eVisa access to Kaliningrad Oblast for up to 8 days.
 – Simplified visa procedure that waives invitation letter requirement is in force for the citizens of Switzerland.
 /  - a universal KAZA visa that is valid for both countries can be issued on arrival to citizens of all EFTA member states.
 /  /  - an East Africa Borderless Visa: Travelers from any country can obtain a multiple entry visa that allows entry to these three countries for tourism over period of 90 days. Visa must be first used in the country that issued it.

Non-ordinary passports
In addition to visa requirements for normal passport holders certain countries have specific visa requirements towards diplomatic and various official passport holders:

Cape Verde, Ethiopia, Mali and Zimbabwe grant visa-free access to holders of diplomatic or service passports issued to nationals of any country. Mauritania and Senegal grant visa-free access to holders of diplomatic passports issued to nationals of any country (except Italy for Mauritania). Bahrain, Bangladesh, Burkina Faso, Cambodia and South Sudan allow holders of diplomatic, official, service and special passports issued to nationals of any country to obtain a visa on arrival.

Non-visa restrictions

Passport rankings

Passport rankings by the number of countries and territories their holders could visit without a visa or by obtaining visa on arrival  were as follows: Swiss — 186 countries and territories (ranked 6th)  Norwegian — 185 (7th); Icelandic — 180 (12th), and Liechtenstein — 178 (14th), according to the Henley Passport Index.

Freedom of movement within EFTA and the EEA

EFTA member states' citizens enjoy freedom of movement in each other's territories in accordance with the EFTA convention. EFTA nationals also enjoy freedom of movement in the European Union (EU). EFTA nationals and EU citizens and are not only visa-exempt but are legally entitled to enter and reside in each other's countries. The Citizens’ Rights Directive (also sometimes called the "Free Movement Directive") defines the right of free movement for citizens of the European Economic Area (EEA), which includes the three EFTA members Iceland, Norway and Liechtenstein and the member states of the EU. Switzerland, which is a member of EFTA but not of the EEA, is not bound by the Directive but rather has a separate bilateral agreement on free movement with the EU.

As a result, de facto, a citizen of an EFTA country can live and work in all the other EFTA countries and in all the EU countries, and a citizen of an EU country can live and work in all the EFTA countries (but for voting and working in sensitive fields, such as government / police / military, citizenship is often required, and non-citizens may not have the same rights to welfare and unemployment benefits as citizens).

As an alternative to holding a passport, a valid national identity card can also be used to exercise the right of free movement within EFTA and the EU/EEA Travellers should still bring a passport or national identity card, as one may be required. Strictly speaking, it is not necessary for an EEA or Swiss citizen to possess a valid passport or national identity card to enter the EEA or Switzerland. In theory, if an EEA or Swiss citizen outside of both the EEA and Switzerland can prove his/her nationality by any other means (e.g. by presenting an expired passport or national identity card, or a citizenship certificate), he/she must be permitted to enter the EEA or Switzerland. An EEA or Swiss citizen who is unable to demonstrate his/her nationality satisfactorily must nonetheless be given 'every reasonable opportunity' to obtain the necessary documents or to have them delivered within a reasonable period of time or corroborate or prove by other means that he/she is covered by the right of free movement.

However, EEA member states and Switzerland can refuse entry to an EEA/Swiss national on public policy, public security or public health grounds where the person presents a "genuine, present and sufficiently serious threat affecting one of the fundamental interests of society". If the person has obtained permanent residence in the country where he/she seeks entry (a status which is normally attained after 5 years of residence), the member state can only expel him/her on serious grounds of public policy or public security. Where the person has resided for 10 years or is a minor, the member state can only expel him/her on imperative grounds of public security (and, in the case of minors, if expulsion is necessary in the best interests of the child, as provided for in the Convention on the Rights of the Child). Expulsion on public health grounds must relate to diseases with 'epidemic potential' which have occurred less than 3 months from the person's the date of arrival in the Member State where he/she seeks entry.

A family member of an EEA/Swiss citizen who is in possession of a residence permit indicating their status is exempt from the requirement to hold a visa when entering the  European Economic Area or Switzerland when they are accompanying their EEA/Swiss family member or are seeking to join them. However the UK requires family members to obtain a special permit in order to enter the United Kingdom. Non-EEA family members will need a Schengen Visa before they travel to Switzerland even if they possess a UK residence permit that clearly mentions that they are the family member of an EEA citizen.

Consular protection of EFTA nationals abroad

When in a foreign country, Norwegian and Icelandic citizens can seek help from the mission of any of the Nordic countries if their own country does not have a diplomatic mission in the country they are visiting. This is according to the Helsinki Treaty, which state that public officials in the foreign services of any of the Nordic countries are to assist citizens of another Nordic country if that country is not represented in the territory concerned.

The Principality of Liechtenstein maintains a very small network of diplomatic missions. Switzerland is representing Liechtenstein in those countries wherein Liechtenstein itself does not maintain consular representation.

See also

Passports of the EFTA member states
Visa policy of the Schengen Area
Visa requirements for Icelandic citizens
Visa requirements for Liechtenstein citizens
Visa requirements for Norwegian citizens
Visa requirements for Swiss citizens

References

External links
Timatic service giving subscribers up-to-date information on visa requirements

Foreign relations of Iceland
Foreign relations of Liechtenstein
Foreign relations of Norway
Foreign relations of Switzerland
 
Member states of the European Free Trade Association
European Economic Area
EFTA nationals